Leptospira broomii is a species of Leptospira isolated from humans with leptospirosis. The type strain is 5399T (=ATCC BAA-1107T =KIT 5399T).

References

Further reading

Levett, PAUL N., and DAVID A. Haake. "Leptospira species (leptospirosis)."Principles and Practice of Infectious Diseases. Edited by: Mandell GL, Bennett JE, Dolin R. Philadelphia: Churchill Livingstone Elsevier 7 (2010): 3059-3065. *Ricaldi, Jessica N., et al. "Whole genome analysis of Leptospira licerasiae provides insight into leptospiral evolution and pathogenicity." PLoS Neglected Tropical Diseases 6.10 (2012): e1853.

External links
LPSN
Type strain of Leptospira broomii at BacDive -  the Bacterial Diversity Metadatabase

broomii
Bacteria described in 2006